Mahinda Rajapaksa International Cricket Stadium, also known as Sooriyawewa International Cricket Stadium,  and abbreviately as MRIC Stadium, is an international cricket stadium in Hambantota, Sri Lanka. It was built for the 2011 Cricket World Cup and hosted two matches, the first being Sri Lanka against Canada, on 20 February 2011. The stadium has a capacity of 35,000 people making It the second largest stadium in Sri Lanka.

History
The proposal for a new International Cricket Stadium at Sooriyawewa was part of the government's programme to develop sports in the Southern Province of Sri Lanka as part of the government's plan to transform Hambantota into the second major urban hub of Sri Lanka, away from Colombo.

The following 2011 Cricket World Cup matches were held at Hambantota International Cricket Stadium in February, 2011. The first official international match was between Sri Lanka and Canada on 20 February 2011, which Sri Lanka won by 210 runs. Two matches were played at the venue during the World Cup.

The Mahinda Rajapaksa International Stadium hosted three 2012 ICC World Twenty20 matches and inaugural edition of Lanka Premier League in 2020. The curator of the ground is Ravi Dissanayake and Manager is Colonel Shanaka Ratnayake.

Criticism
With low coverage of international matches in very rural area, it has come under extreme criticism and has been called a white elephant as only a few matches were held in the stadium considering the extreme costs for construction and maintenance. The ministers of opposition criticize that former government has hidden the true story of actual cost for its construction. To gain revenue the Stadium is often hired out for wedding receptions, however, former Prime Minister Ranil Wickremesinghe has proposed that the stadium should be used for training purposes to gain revenue.

In 2016, after the inspections by Sri Lanka Cricket, president Thilanga Sumathipala pointed out that the walls, carpets, furniture and equipment in the stadium are in a severe state of neglect and deterioration without any attempt to revive the facility to its earlier status.

Lanka Premier League
Initially, 2020 Lanka Premier League was scheduled to be held in Kandy, Dambulla and Hambantota. Due to COVID-19 pandemic in Sri Lanka, health officials agreed to reducing the quarantine period for foreign players from 14 days to 7 days. Following the urge from health officials, all 23 matches would be held in Mahinda Rajapaksa International Cricket Stadium. In 2021 venue hosted 2021 Lanka Premier League Playoffs matches as well.

World Cup Cricket
In 2011, Mahinda Rajapaksa International Stadium hosted two successful world cup matches.

2011 Cricket World Cup

ICC World Twenty20
Sri Lanka hosted the 2012 ICC World Twenty20. Three matches were played at Mahinda Rajapaksa International Stadium. Other matches were played at R. Premadasa Stadium and Pallekele International Cricket Stadium.

2012 ICC World Twenty20

International five-wicket hauls

Three five-wicket hauls have been taken at Mahinda Rajapaksa International Cricket Stadium in Hambantota, all in men's limited overs international matches.

One Day International five-wicket hauls

Twenty20 International five-wicket hauls

See also
 List of international cricket grounds in Sri Lanka

Notes

References

External links
 Cricinfo profile on Hambantota
 Suriyawewa Cricket Stadium Hambantota Layout
 Guide to Hambantota

Cricket grounds in Sri Lanka
Buildings and structures in Hambantota District
2009 establishments in Sri Lanka
2011 Cricket World Cup stadiums